Ebenezer Baptist Church is a church in Atlanta, Georgia, U.S., known for its ties to Dr. Martin Luther King, Jr.

Ebenezer Baptist Church may also refer to:

United States

Alabama 
Ebenezer Missionary Baptist Church (Auburn, Alabama)
First Ebenezer Baptist Church, Birmingham, Alabama

Illinois 
Ebenezer Missionary Baptist Church (Chicago), Illinois, where gospel music choirs were first organized and Bo Diddley learned music

Kansas 
Ebenezer Baptist Church (Atchison, Kansas), U.S.

Virginia 
Ebenezer Baptist Church (Richmond, Virginia), U.S.
Ebenezer Baptist Churches, Bloomfield, Virginia, U.S.

United Kingdom
 Ebenezer Baptist Chapel, Llandovery, Wales
 Ebenezer, Ammanford, Wales
 Ebenezer Particular Baptist Chapel, Hastings, England
 Ebenezer Chapel, Heathfield, England